Alexander Laing Halkett (25 September 1881 – 21 February 1917), sometimes known as Ecky Halkett or Alick Halkett, was a Scottish professional footballer who played in the Scottish League for Aberdeen, Dundee and St Johnstone as a right half.

Personal life 
Halkett's older brother John was also a footballer. Prior to his enlistment as a gunner in the Royal Field Artillery during the First World War, he worked as a wheelwright at Royal Naval Dockyard Rosyth. Halkett was killed in action in Pas-de-Calais, France on 21 February 1917 and was buried in Sailly-au-Bois Military Cemetery.

Career statistics

Honours 
Aberdeen
 Scottish Qualifying Cup: 1904–05
 Fleming Charity Shield: 1906–07

References

1917 deaths
1880s births
British military personnel killed in World War I
Association football wing halves
Scottish footballers
Dundee F.C. players
Aberdeen F.C. players
St Johnstone F.C. players
Scottish Football League players
British Army personnel of World War I
Royal Field Artillery soldiers
Scottish Junior Football Association players
Dundee Violet F.C. players
Portsmouth F.C. players
Southern Football League players
Forfar Athletic F.C. players
Footballers from Dunfermline
Reading F.C. players